Sunggal is a town and district of Deli Serdang Regency in the province of North Sumatra, Indonesia. The population of the town was 10,933 in 2010   and 10,071 in 2020. It is the district capital of the Sunggal district (kecamatan).

Sunggal District
The district, with an area of 92.52 km2 and a population of 241,359 at the 2020 Census, is composed of seventeen 'villages' (many of which are suburban to the neighbouring city of Medan which is situated to the east of the district), set out below with their areas and their populations at the 2010 Census and the 2020 Census.

References

Sumatra
Populated places in North Sumatra